The Patchwork Girl of Oz by L. Frank Baum is a children's novel, the seventh in the Oz series. Characters include the Woozy, Ojo "the Unlucky", Unc Nunkie, Dr. Pipt, Scraps (the patchwork girl), and others. The book was first published on July 1, 1913, with illustrations by John R. Neill. In 1914, Baum adapted the book to film through his "Oz Film Manufacturing Company."

In the previous Oz book, The Emerald City of Oz, magic was used to isolate Oz from all contact with the outside world. Baum did this to end the Oz series, but was forced to restart the series with this book due to financial hardship. In the prologue, he reconciles Oz's isolation with the appearance of a new Oz book by explaining that he contacted Dorothy in Oz via wireless telegraphy, and she obtained Ozma's permission to tell Baum this story. 

The book was dedicated to Sumner Hamilton Britton, the young son of one of its publishers, Sumner Charles Britton of Reilly & Britton.

Plot
Ojo, known as Ojo the Unlucky, lives in poverty with his laconic uncle Unc Nunkie in the woods of the Munchkin Country in Oz. They visit their neighbor, the magician Dr. Pipt who is about to complete the six-year process of preparing the magical Powder of Life, which can bring inanimate objects to life. Pipt's wife has constructed a life-sized stuffed girl out of patchwork, and wishes her husband to animate her to serve as an obedient household servant. They also meet another of Pipt's creations, Bungle, an extremely vain talking cat made of glass. The Powder of Life successfully animates the patchwork girl, but an accident causes both Pipt's wife and Unc Nunkie to be turned to stone. Dr. Pipt tells Ojo that he must obtain five ingredients to make a compound to counteract the petrifaction spell.

Ojo and the patchwork girl, who calls herself Scraps, along with Bungle, embark on a journey to obtain the magic ingredients: a six-leaved clover, the wing of a yellow butterfly, water from a dark well, a drop of oil from a live man's body, and three hairs from a Woozy's tail. Scraps exhibits a wild, carefree personality, and is prone to spontaneous recitation of nonsense poetry. After several adventures, they meet a Woozy, a blocky quadruped who agrees to let them have three hairs from its tail. But they are unable to remove the hairs, so they take the Woozy along with them.

The party is captured by large animate plants, but they are rescued by the fortuitous arrival of the Shaggy Man. He leads them to the Emerald City to meet Princess Ozma, but warns Ojo that picking a six-leaved clover is forbidden by law in Oz. Along the way they meet the Scarecrow, who is quite smitten with Scraps, as she is with him. Just outside the Emerald City, Ojo sees a six-leaved clover by the road and, believing himself to be unobserved, picks it. When they arrive at the city gates, the Soldier with the Green Whiskers approaches them and announces that Ojo is under arrest.

Brought to trial before Ozma, Ojo confesses and Ozma pardons him and allows him to keep the clover. Dorothy and the Scarecrow join Ojo and Scraps as they continue their search for the remaining ingredients. Along the way they meet Jack Pumpkinhead, the playful but annoying Tottenhots, and the man-eating 21-foot-tall giant Mr. Yoop, before reaching the subterranean dwellings of the Hoppers, who each have just one leg, and the neighboring Horners, who each have one horn on their head. The two groups are on the verge of war due to a misunderstanding, but Scraps reconciles them. A grateful Horner leads the group to a well in a dark radium mine, and Ojo collects a flask of water from it.

The group continues to the castle of the Tin Woodsman who rules the Winkie Country, since yellow butterflies are most likely to be found in that yellow-dominated quadrant of Oz. While talking to the Tin Woodsman, Ojo notices a drop of oil about to drip from his body, and he catches it in a vial. He explains that he now has all the ingredients except one. But when he describes the last one, the Tin Woodsman is horrified at the idea of killing an innocent butterfly, and forbids them from doing so in his realm. Ojo is devastated, but the Tin Woodsman proposes that they all travel back to the Emerald City to ask Ozma's advice.

Ozma tells them that Dr. Pipt has been practicing magic illegally and has therefore been deprived of his powers. But the petrified Unc Nunkie and Pipt's wife have been brought to the Emerald City and as they all watch, the Wizard of Oz restores them to life. Ojo and Unc Nunkie are given a new house to live in near the Emerald City and the Tin Woodsman calls Ojo "Ojo the Lucky".

Background and analysis
In reference to The Patchwork Girl of Oz, one of Baum's letters to his publisher, Sumner Britton of Reilly & Britton, offers unusual insight on Baum's manner of creating his Oz fantasies:

The same correspondence (November 23–7, 1912) discusses the deleted Chapter 21 of the book, "The Garden of Meats." The text of the chapter has not survived, but Neill's illustrations and their captions still exist. The deleted chapter dealt with a race of vegetable people comparable to the Mangaboos in Chapters 4–6 of Dorothy and the Wizard in Oz. The vegetable people grow what Baum elsewhere calls "meat people," apparently for food; Neill's pictures show plants with the heads of human children being watered by their growers. (This is thematically connected with the anthropophagous plants in Chapter 10 of Patchwork Girl.) Frank Reilly tactfully wrote to Baum that the material was not "in harmony with your other fairy stories," and would generate "considerable adverse criticism." Baum saw his point; the chapter was dropped.

At least at one point in his life, Baum stated that he considered The Patchwork Girl of Oz "one of the two best books of my career", the other being The Sea Fairies. The book was a popular success, selling just over 17,000 copies—though this was somewhat lower than the total for the previous book, The Emerald City of Oz, and marked the start of a trend in declining sales for the Oz books that would not reverse until The Tin Woodman of Oz in 1918.

Adaptations
Baum wrote and produced a film based on the book, titled The Patchwork Girl of Oz. It was made by Baum's studio The Oz Film Manufacturing Company, and was released in 1914.

Baum also wrote a musical stage adaptation of the book, circa 1913, with composer Louis F. Gottschalk; however, this musical was never staged. Excerpts have occasionally been performed at various annual conventions of The International Wizard of Oz Club.

Criticism

While Baum's work as a whole is occasionally criticized for using what may be seen as racial and ethnic stereotypes, the Patchwork Girl has come in for particular criticism. Harvard Professor Robin Bernstein suggests the Patchwork Girl character was influenced by Topsy in Uncle Tom's Cabin and points out she was created by Dr. Pipt's wife to be a slave.  Moreover, the original text included a song (by the similarly animated Phonograph) about "mah coal black Lulu"; the lyric, evocative of minstrelsy, was changed in later editions to "my cross-eyed Lulu". Similarly problematic is the inclusion in the book of a set of creatures called the Tottenhots, likely meant to be a play on the ethnic term Hottentots.

Notes

Bibliography

External links

 
 The Patchwork Girl of Oz at Internet Archive
 
 

Oz (franchise) books
1913 American novels
1913 fantasy novels
American fantasy novels adapted into films
Sequel novels
Books about cats